The James Watt Dock Crane is a giant cantilever crane situated at Greenock on the River Clyde.

History
It was built in 1917 by Sir William Arrol & Co. It was rated to lift , and is a category A listed structure. Apart from an adjacent derelict mobile Smith Rodley, it is the only crane left in the dock after the yards were cleared for redevelopment.

The crane was used for the fitting out of ships.

See also
 List of Category A listed buildings in Inverclyde 
 List of listed buildings in Greenock

References

External links

 Photo gallery at catchingphotons.co.uk

Buildings and structures in Greenock
Individual cranes (machines)
Category A listed buildings in Inverclyde
Buildings and structures completed in 1917
1917 establishments in Scotland